Jan Fiala (born 19 May 1956 in Slatinice) is a Czech former football player.

He played 58 matches for the Czechoslovakia national football team, for which he scored one goal. He was a member of the bronze team in the 1980 UEFA European Football Championship even if he didn't play a single match. He was a participant in the 1982 FIFA World Cup, where he played all three matches.

Fiala played his whole career in Czechoslovakia for Dukla Prague. He played for them 310 league matches and won the Czechoslovak First League in 1977, 1979 and 1982. In 1982, he was also voted the Czechoslovak Footballer of the Year. He then played for Le Havre AC from 1987 to 1988.

References

External links
 

1956 births
Living people
Czech footballers
Czechoslovak footballers
Czechoslovakia international footballers
Dukla Prague footballers
Le Havre AC players
Bourges 18 players
Ligue 1 players
Ligue 2 players
UEFA Euro 1980 players
1982 FIFA World Cup players
Czechoslovak expatriate footballers
Expatriate footballers in France
Czechoslovak expatriate sportspeople in France
Association football defenders
People from Olomouc District
Sportspeople from the Olomouc Region